Afterburner was a roller coaster at Fun Spot Amusement Park & Zoo in Angola, Indiana.

History
It was the only operating roller coaster with an inversion in the state of Indiana until 2008 when Steel Hawg opened at Indiana Beach. It was also notable for formerly using an elevator to transport disabled passengers to the loading platform. Afterburner is the original prototype of Arrow Development's "Launched Loop" shuttle style coaster.

From 1977 to 1990, it was known as "Zoomerang", first at Circus World, then at its short-lived replacement, Boardwalk and Baseball. Both parks were located in Haines City, Florida.

The Afterburner was taken down in February 2017.

References

Roller coasters in Indiana
Buildings and structures in Steuben County, Indiana
1991 establishments in Indiana
Former roller coasters in Indiana